Dorota Banaszczyk born 1997 in Łódź, Poland) is a Polish karate athlete competing in kumite -55 kg division. Her biggest success is the gold medal of the world championships of seniors in 2018 in the kumite competition individually, cat. 55 kg.

In 2017, she competed in the women's kumite 55 kg event at the 2017 World Games held in Wrocław, Poland.

In June 2021, she competed at the World Olympic Qualification Tournament held in Paris, France hoping to qualify for the 2020 Summer Olympics in Tokyo, Japan. In November 2021, she competed in the women's 61 kg event at the 2021 World Karate Championships held in Dubai, United Arab Emirates.

Achievements 

2018
  24th World Karate championship - (ESP) - Kumite -55 kg

2019
  Karatei Premier League PARIS 2019 - (FRA) - Kumite -55 kg

2017
  10th WKF Training Camp & Karatei Youth CUP (CRO) - Kumite -55 kg

2017
  4TH EKF Junior, Cadet and U21 Championship (BUL) - Kumite -55 kg

2013
  Karatei Premier League and Youth World Cup 2013 – Grand Final - Salzburg 2013 (AUT) - Kumite -55 kg

References

Polish female karateka
1997 births
Living people
European Games competitors for Poland
Karateka at the 2019 European Games
Competitors at the 2017 World Games
20th-century Polish women
21st-century Polish women